S100 calcium-binding protein A3 (S100A3) is a protein that in humans is encoded by the S100A3 gene.

The protein encoded by this gene is a member of the S100 family of proteins containing 2 EF-hand calcium-binding motifs. S100 proteins are localized in the cytoplasm and/or nucleus of a wide range of cells, and involved in the regulation of a number of cellular processes such as cell cycle progression and differentiation. S100 genes include at least 13 members which are located as a cluster on chromosome 1q21. This protein has the highest content of cysteines of all S100 proteins, has a high affinity for Zinc, and is highly expressed in human hair cuticle. The precise function of this protein is unknown.

References

Further reading

S100 proteins